Leonard Stanley Nnamdi Ekeh (born February 22, 1956 in Imo State, Nigeria) is a Nigerian businessman. He is the founder and chairman of Zinox Group. He is also the chairman of Konga.com.

Early life 
Ekeh was born in Ubomiri Mbaitoli, Imo State to a middle-class family with three brothers and two sisters. His mother was a dietitian, and his father was a nurse.

Education 
Ekeh attended Holy Ghost College, Owerri for his secondary education. During his early years, he wanted to own the biggest transport company in Nigeria.

He later went to India for his university education, where he received a Bachelor of Science degree in Economics from Punjab University. Ekeh believes that studying in India was “a great turning point in my life because I found the economy of India a realistic economy”. Ekeh also earned an MSc in Risk Management from the University of Nottingham.

Business career 

Leo Stan Ekeh started Zinox Technologies Limited in 2001 to manufacture computers. He ensured that at launch Zinox Computers already had the WHQL certification, the first in sub-Saharan Africa, consolidated 5 years later with the attainment of the NIS ISO 2000: 9001 QMS Certification. In October 2013, the company announced the production of its computer tablet line named Zipad. In February 2018, Ekeh's company Zinox acquired Konga.com from its owners buying 99% of the total company shares.

References 

Living people
People from Imo State
Igbo businesspeople
1956 births
Officers of the Order of the Federal Republic
20th-century Nigerian businesspeople
21st-century Nigerian businesspeople
Nigerian technology businesspeople
Nigerian company founders
Businesspeople in information technology
Nigerian chairpersons of corporations